Leon Winiarski (1865–1915) was a Polish sociologist. Pupil of Vilfredo Pareto and later Professor of Sociology at the University of Geneva.

Notes

Further reading
Ian Steedman, Socialism and Marginalism in Economics, Routledge, 1995, Google Print, p.199-200

1865 births
1915 deaths
Polish sociologists